Leucocarpus is a genus of flowering plants belonging to the family Phrymaceae.

Its native range is Mexico to Venezuela and Bolivia.

Species
Species:
 Leucocarpus perfoliatus (Kunth) Benth.

References

Phrymaceae
Lamiales genera